The Grand Prix Miguel Induráin, formerly the "Grand Prix Navarre" is a Spanish one-day road bicycle race.

History
The race was inaugurated in 1951, but was limited to local competition. It was rebranded after the Spanish cyclist in 1998.  In 2005, the race was upgraded to a 1.1 event on the UCI Europe Tour. For 2007 and 2008 the race was further upgraded to a 1.HC event. The race will become part of the new UCI ProSeries in 2020. These higher grades have attracted an increasingly competitive and international field of racers.

The race often loops through the city of Estella-Lizarra, in the Spanish region of Navarre.  The modern race always includes several challenging climbs and thus tends to favor a fast all-rounder, rather than a climber or a pure sprinter.

Hortensio Vidaurreta, Miguel María Lasa, Juan Fernández, Ángel Vicioso, and Alejandro Valverde share the record for most wins with three each.

Past winners

References

External links
 2003 results
 2004 results
  2005 results
 2006 results
 2007 results
 2008 results
 2009 results

UCI Europe Tour races
Recurring sporting events established in 1951
1951 establishments in Spain
Cycle races in Spain
Sport in Navarre